Dysgonomonas mossii is a Gram-negative and facultatively anaerobic bacterium from the genus of Dysgonomonas which has been isolated from an abdominal drainage from a human from the Holy Cross Hospital in Detroit in the United States.

References

External links
Type strain of Dysgonomonas mossii at BacDive -  the Bacterial Diversity Metadatabase	

Bacteroidia
Bacteria described in 2002